Harold B. Crosby (September 21, 1918 – January 10, 1996) was the founding president of the University of West Florida and the second president of Florida International University.  He received his bachelor's degree from Northwestern University, and his law degree from the University of Florida. He married Margaret Dutton Crosby, and they had two children: Susan Crosby Cross and Anne Bryan Crosby Higgins. He was remarried with Constance Westbury.

References

External links
UWF page on Crosby
Florida International University history
Harold Crosby's obituary

1918 births
1996 deaths
Northwestern University alumni
Presidents of Florida International University
Presidents of University of West Florida
Fredric G. Levin College of Law alumni
20th-century American academics